Trenton James Jackson (February 28, 1943 – March 25, 2007) was an American football wide receiver in the National Football League for the Philadelphia Eagles and the Washington Redskins.  He played college football at the University of Illinois.

Early life
Jackson was born in Cordele, Georgia to James and Evelyn Jackson and is the eldest of seven children.  The family later moved to Rochester, New York, where he attended Benjamin Franklin High School, where he set the National High School Record in the 100 yard dash (9.4).

College career
Jackson then attended and played college football at University of Illinois, where he was voted an All-American.  While there, he was a Big Ten and Rose Bowl champion, and lettered in track, football, basketball, and baseball.  In 1964, he won the Big Ten 100 yard Dash in 9.5, the 220 yard dash in 21.3, and anchored the championship 440 yard relay.  He also won the NCAA 4x110 yard relay championship, set the National Collegiate Record in the 100 meter dash (10.1), won the AAU 100 meter championship and then participated in the US Olympic Trials 100 meter dash.  After, he represented the United States at the 1964 Summer Olympics in Tokyo, Japan and became a member of Omega Psi Phi Fraternity.  In 1965, he finished third at the NCAA 60 yard dash.  Then, he led Illinois to the 4x440 yard relay championship at the outdoor Big Ten championship.  Jackson's record for the 100 meters held at Illinois for 40 years.

Professional sports career
In 1966, Jackson was drafted by the St. Louis Cardinals baseball team.  However, he chose to play football in the National Football League for the Philadelphia Eagles and then the Washington Redskins.

Personal
Jackson married Pamela Kittelberger and had four children.  After retiring from football, Jackson taught in the Rochester City School District for over 30 years.   Also a sports coach, Jackson was inducted into the Section V Track and Field, Football, and Basketball Hall of Fames as a player and coach.  Jackson died on March 25, 2007.

Honors
Jackson was inducted as an inaugural member of the Frontier Walk of Fame in 1997 and was then an inaugural member of the Niagara Track & Field Hall of Fame in 1998.

References

External links
Obituary

1943 births
2007 deaths
American football wide receivers
Illinois Fighting Illini football players
Illinois Fighting Illini men's track and field athletes
Philadelphia Eagles players
Washington Redskins players
People from Cordele, Georgia
Players of American football from New York (state)
Track and field athletes from New York (state)
Sportspeople from Rochester, New York
Athletes (track and field) at the 1964 Summer Olympics
American male sprinters
Olympic track and field athletes of the United States
Track and field athletes in the National Football League